Coporaque District is one of twenty districts of the Caylloma Province in Peru.

Geography 
The Chila mountain range traverses the district. Other mountains are listed below:

 Hatun Urqu
 Pumachiri
 Uma Qala
 Willkayuq
 Yuraq Qaqa

Ethnic groups 
The people in the district are mainly indigenous citizens of Quechua descent. Quechua is the language which the majority of the population (61.18%) learnt to speak in childhood, 37.62% of the residents started speaking using the Spanish language (2007 Peru Census).

See also 
 Pukara
 Qantumayu

References

Districts of the Caylloma Province
Districts of the Arequipa Region